Pedro de Valencia (died 1631) was a Roman Catholic prelate who served as Bishop of La Paz (1617–1631) and Bishop of Santiago de Guatemala (1615–1617).

De Valencia was born in Lima, Peru. 
On 28 September 1615, he was appointed during the papacy of Pope Paul V as Bishop of Santiago de Guatemala.
In 1616, he was consecrated bishop by Bartolomé Lobo Guerrero, Archbishop of Lima. 
On 30 July 1617, he was appointed during the papacy of Pope Paul V as Bishop of La Paz. 
He served as Bishop of La Paz until his death in 1631.

References

External links and additional sources
 (for Chronology of Bishops) 
 (for Chronology of Bishops) 
 (for Chronology of Bishops) 
 (for Chronology of Bishops) 

17th-century Roman Catholic bishops in Guatemala
Bishops appointed by Pope Paul V
1631 deaths
17th-century Roman Catholic bishops in Bolivia
Roman Catholic bishops of Guatemala (pre-1743)
Roman Catholic bishops of La Paz